Margaret Shaw Rayburn (April 5, 1927 – May 14, 2013) was an American politician and teacher who served as a member of the Washington House of Representatives.

Early life and education 
Born in North Powder, Oregon, Rayburn graduated from Eastern Washington University with a Bachelor of Arts degree in education.

Career 
After graduating from college, Rayburn worked as a teacher in Grandview, Washington. After she retired from teaching, Rayburn was elected to the Washington House of Representatives from 1985 to 1995 as a Democrat. She and her husband operated an orchard near Grandview, Washington.

Death 
Rayburn died in Sunnyside, Washington.

References

1927 births
2013 deaths
People from Union County, Oregon
People from Yakima County, Washington
Eastern Washington University alumni
Businesspeople from Washington (state)
Women state legislators in Washington (state)
Democratic Party members of the Washington House of Representatives
20th-century American businesspeople
20th-century American women
21st-century American women